The third season of the American television drama series Scandal, created by Shonda Rhimes, began on October 3, 2013, in the United States, on ABC, and consisted of 18 episodes. The season was produced by ABC Studios, in association with ShondaLand Production Company; the showrunner being Shonda Rhimes. 

The season continues the story of Olivia Pope's crisis management firm, Olivia Pope & Associates, and its staff, as well as staff at the White House in Washington D.C. Season three had ten series regulars, all returning from the previous season, of whom seven are part of the original cast of eight regulars from the first season. The season aired in the Thursday 10:00 pm timeslot, the same as the previous seasons.

For her performance, Kerry Washington won the Image Award for Outstanding Actress in a Drama Series and was nominated for Outstanding Performance in a Drama Series at the Screen Actors Guild Award, Best Actress in a Television Series at the Golden Globe Awards, and Outstanding Lead Actress in a Drama Series at the Primetime Emmy Awards.

Plot
The season focuses on Fitz's re-election campaign for his second term, as well as, Olivia's family problems after her father comes back into her life and she discovers that her mother (believed to be deceased for 20 years) is alive, which leads to Olivia Pope & Associates trying to find Olivia's mother, Maya Lewis.

After Olivia's name is leaked to the press as Fitz's mistress, Olivia Pope & Associates face financial troubles when all their clients fire them.  The firm accepts "new" clients in order to pay the bills. Rowan becomes more involved with Olivia's life, which begins to affect her, and leads Huck and Jake to investigate B613. They discover during a military action code named "Operation Remington" Fitz shot down a civilian aircraft over Iceland and Olivia's mother was one of over 300 casualties. Olivia goes to Fitz and asks him about it, but he refuses to respond. Determined to find out the truth about Operation Remington, the firm investigates Rowan and learns that a passenger was removed from the flight by a Federal Marshall just prior to take off.  Quinn starts to hang out with Charlie, who sets her up to kill a security guard who was an eye-witness to the Federal Marshall's removal of the passenger. As a result of Quinn's inadvertent murder, Huck tortures her and she leaves the firm. 

It's revealed that Maya was the passenger who didn't get on the plane, and that she has been imprisoned by Rowan for the last 20 years. She manages to break free and Olivia is shocked when her "dead" mother contacts her.  When Rowan finds out about Maya's escape, he puts her on FBI's most wanted terrorists list. Olivia manages to arrange a flight to Hong Kong with Maya on it, but after she leaves Olivia figures out that Maya really is a terrorist by the name Marie Wallace. After Fitz captures Rowan at the Pentagon, Olivia asks Fitz to arrest her mother, but Maya manages to escape.

Meanwhile, Fitz faces problems when Congresswoman Josephine "Josie" Marcus is in the running to win the Democratic Party primary against Senator Samuel Reston and become the first female president of the United States. Cyrus tries his best to find dirt on Marcus in order to ruin her campaign, but fails. After Olivia finds out that Fitz shot down the plane which killed her mother, she declines the offer of being the campaign manager for Fitz's re-election and becomes the manager for Josephine Marcus'. After an incident with Marcus' sister, Josephine backs out of her campaign. 

Cyrus discovers that Sally plans to run against Fitz as an Independent when she hires Leo Bergen to be her campaign manager. He tries to blackmail her by having James flirt with her husband, Daniel Douglas. However, James figures out Cyrus' plan, and sleeps with Daniel devastating Cyrus. When Sally finds out about this, she becomes furious and kills her husband.  After the murder, Sally calls Cyrus for help. David gets a visit from a woman from the NSA who has the recording of the conversation between Sally and Cyrus, which David shares with James. 

The second part of the season focuses more on the re-election campaign as Olivia has taken over as the campaign manager. At the same time, Sally announces that she is running for president by being an Independent. As a result, Fitz chooses the governor of California, Andrew Nichols, as his new vice presidential running-mate.  It is revealed that Nichols had a romantic relationship with the First Lady, Mellie.  The campaign faces problems when Sally, stricken with guilt over murdering Daniel, almost reveals the truth at a debate. Cyrus asks Jake to help protect the secret, which he does by killing James to prevent exposing Cyrus's involvement in the cover up.  The president's eldest children, Jerry and Karen Grant, come to the White House for an interview, but Olivia soon figures out that they aren't pleased with their parents. 

Maya and Adnan Salif team up with Dominic Bell, who gives them a bomb. Olivia and her team, with the help of Rowan, track down Dominic and try to find Maya. In the season finale, the bomb goes off in a church, which Sally uses to her advantage to rise in the polls. On the election day, Olivia and Cyrus are convinced that Fitz has lost, but Rowan orders Tom to kill Jerry, which ultimately makes Fitz win the election. Olivia takes up her father's offer and leaves with Jake to an unknown location for a new life.

Cast and characters

Main

 Kerry Washington as Olivia Pope 
 Columbus Short as Harrison Wright 
 Scott Foley as Jacob "Jake" Ballard 
 Darby Stanchfield as Abigail "Abby" Whelan 
 Katie Lowes as Quinn Perkins
 Guillermo Diaz as Huck 
 Jeff Perry as White House Chief of Staff Cyrus Beene 
 Joshua Malina as David Rosen 
 Bellamy Young as First Lady Melody "Mellie" Grant 
 Tony Goldwyn as President Fitzgerald "Fitz" Thomas Grant III

Recurring
 Joe Morton as Eli "Rowan" Pope 
 Kate Burton as Vice President Sally Langston
 George Newbern as Charlie 
 Paul Adelstein as Leo Bergen 
 Khandi Alexander as Maya Lewis/Marie Wallace 
 Dan Bucatinsky as James Novak 
 Brian Letscher as Tom Larsen 
 Sharmila Devar as Lauren Wellman 
 Jon Tenney as Governor Andrew Nichols
 Nazanin Boniadi as Adnan Salif 
 Jack Coleman as Second Gentleman Daniel Douglas Langston 
 Lisa Kudrow as Congresswoman Josephine "Josie" Marcus
 Tom Amandes as Governor Samuel Reston
 Samantha Sloyan as Jeannine Locke 
 Dylan Minnette as Fitzgerald "Jerry" Grant IV 
 Sally Pressman as Candace Marcus 
 Carlo Rota as Ivan 
 Erica Shaffer as News Reporter
 Madeline Carroll as Karen Grant 
 Mackenzie Astin as Noah Baker

Guest stars
 Cynthia Stevenson as Mary Nesbitt
 Norm Lewis as Senator Edison Davis
 Mark Moses as Congressman Jim Struthers
 Ernie Hudson as FBI Commander Randolph Boles
 Gregg Henry as Hollis Doyle
 Patrick Fabian as Senator Richard Meyers
 Melora Hardin as Shelley Meyers
 Barry Bostwick as Fitzgerald Grant II
 Brenda Strong as Joan Reston
 Sebastian Roché as Dominic Bell

Production
Scandal was renewed for a third season on May 10, 2013. Along with other ABC dramas, this season was split into two runs of uninterrupted episodes, the first consisting of ten episodes. The second run, initially set to consist of 12 uninterrupted episodes, began on February 27, 2014. On December 7, 2013, ABC Studios, announced that due to Kerry Washington's pregnancy, the overall episode order would be trimmed from 22 to 18, which led the season finale to air four weeks earlier on April 17, 2014.

It was announced on May 9, 2014 by ABC that Scandal would return in the fall of 2014 for Season 4.

Casting

The third season had ten roles receiving star billing, with all of them returning from the previous season, seven of which part of the original cast from the first season. Kerry Washington continued her role as protagonist of the series, Olivia Pope, a former White House Director of Communications with her own crisis management firm. Scott Foley was upgraded to a series regular, portraying Captain Jake Ballard. Darby Stanchfield played Abby Whelan, Katie Lowes acted as Quinn Perkins who leaves Olivia's firm in the second part of the season for B613. Guillermo Diaz continued playing the character Huck, the troubled tech guy who works for Olivia. Jeff Perry played Cyrus Beene, the Chief of Staff at the White House, who loses his husband James. Joshua Malina played David Rosen, now the re-instated U.S. Attorney. Bellamy Young continued playing First Lady Melody "Mellie" Grant, who begins a relationship with Andrew Nichols, Fitz's Vice President nominee, while Tony Goldwyn portrayed President Fitzgerald "Fitz" Thomas Grant III. 

On June 14, 2013, Scott Foley was promoted to regular as of the third season. Casting for Lisa Kudrow was announced on August 28, and was revealed to be playing Congresswoman Josephine Marcus for multiple episodes. Private Practice alum Paul Adelstein was announced to join the cast as Leo Bergen, however at the time of the announcement, details on who he would play were kept under wraps. On September 23, 2013, it was announced that Sally Pressman would be playing a recurring role on the show, which turned out to be the sister of Congresswoman Josephine Marcus, played by Lisa Kudrow. Jack Coleman joined the cast in a recurring role as Daniel Douglas, the husband to Vice President Sally Langston. 

On November 5, 2013, Khandi Alexander was cast in a recurring role as Olivia's mother for a multiple episode arc. On December 3, 2013, it was announced that the show was casting for a new role as a handsome, charismatic fella named Andrew, who would be a love interest for Bellamy Young's character, Mellie. A few days later, on December 6, 2013, actor Jon Tenney was announced to have landed the role of Andrew. On January 28, 2014, it was announced that Scandal was casting the guest-starring roles of Jerry Grant and Karen Grant, Tony Goldwyn and Bellamy Young's characters' children<ref>{{cite web|url=http://tvline.com/2014/01/28/scandal-season-3-cast-fitz-and-mellies-kids-jerry-karen/|title=Exclusive: Scandal to Finally Introduce Fitz's Kids|work=TVLine|last=Webb Mitovich|first=Matt|date=February 7, 2014|accessdate=January 28, 2014|archive-url=https://web.archive.org/web/20140129135841/http://tvline.com/2014/01/28/scandal-season-3-cast-fitz-and-mellies-kids-jerry-karen/|archive-date=January 29, 2014|url-status=live}}</ref> A week later, on February 6, 2014, it was reported that the guest-starring roles of Jerry and Karen had been landed by Dylan Minnette and Madeline Carroll. The duo appeared in the fifteenth episode in addition to the season finale.

Episodes

Reception
The season premiere returned with generally favorable reviews from critics, with many commenting that the show lived up to and if anything surpassed the high bar set by the previous season. The review aggregator website Rotten Tomatoes reports a 100% approval rating with average rating of 9/10 based on 10 reviews. The website's consensus reads, "Scandal finds its footing in season three, allowing its characters to blossom and providing the kind of intrigue that makes serialized television so addictive." In social media, the season premiere delivered 712,877 tweets, making Scandal'' #1 most social series on Thursday night. Kerry Washington was nominated for an Emmy Award (Outstanding Lead Actress in a Drama Series) and a Golden Globe Award for her performance in the season.

The season premiere had 10.5 million total viewers, up 71 percent from last season's start in September 2012. The season finale had 10.5 million total viewers, up 15% from last season's finale in May 2013. The third season had an average of 11.5 million in Total Viewers, up 39% from the second season which had a total of 8.3 million. It also went up in Adults 18-49 with 43% with an average of 4.0/12, while the previous season had a 2.8/8. This qualifies Scandal as TV’s fastest growing returning series. Repeats air on BET.

Ratings

Live + SD ratings

Live + 7 Day (DVR) ratings

Awards and nominations

DVD release

References

External links
 
 

2013 American television seasons
2014 American television seasons
Season 3